Rosetta is a residential locality in the local government area (LGA) of Glenorchy in the Hobart LGA region of Tasmania. The 2016 census recorded a population of 2731 for the state suburb of Rosetta.
It is a suburb of Hobart. The suburb is situated between the suburbs of Berriedale and Montrose and is approximately 15 minutes drive from Hobart. There is a primary school and a high school in Rosetta. The Brooker Highway runs along the eastern border of the suburb, next to the Derwent River.

History 
Rosetta was gazetted as a locality in 1961.

Geography
The River Derwent forms the north-eastern boundary.

Road infrastructure 
National Route 1 (Brooker Highway) runs through from north-east to south-east.

Retail/facilities of Rosetta
 Rosetta Plumbing
 Marys Hope Road, hot food and convenience store
 Undine Colonial, bed and breakfast

References

Suburbs of Hobart
Towns in Tasmania
Localities of City of Glenorchy